The 2002 Ohio State Buckeyes football team represented Ohio State University during the 2002 NCAA Division I-A football season. The team was the first in NCAA Division I-A—now known as NCAA Division I Football Bowl Subdivision (FBS)—history to finish its season at 14–0 following BYU's 14–1 season in 1996. Led by co-MVPs junior quarterback Craig Krenzel and sophomore wide receiver/cornerback Chris Gamble, freshman standout tailback Maurice Clarett, and senior safety Mike Doss, the Buckeyes won the Big Ten, then won the 2003 Fiesta Bowl, which was also the 2003 BCS National Championship Game, to finish as college football's national champions for the first time since 1968.

Preseason
Despite a 7–5 season the year before, the general feeling was one of optimism in Columbus, Ohio, provided that the defense could carry the team while the offense developed. First year coach Jim Tressel was able to deliver on his promise of an upset victory over the University of Michigan in Ann Arbor. Twice All-American safety Mike Doss, in an emotional announcement on January 9, 2002, advised that he would not declare himself for the NFL draft and would return to Ohio State for his senior season. (SI, p. 75) Maurice Clarett, a freshman prospect, graduated early from high school and enrolled at Ohio State for the 2002 Winter Quarter to make himself eligible to participate in spring football practice. (Lindy's, p. 15; SI p. 16)

Prior to the 2002 season, the Buckeyes were ranked thirteenth in the AP Poll after losing the Outback Bowl on a last second field goal to the South Carolina Gamecocks. The Big Ten Conference summer media day sessions predicted Ohio State to finish second in the conference behind Michigan and ahead of Michigan State. (Keels, p. 12)

Team captains selected were seniors Mike Doss and Donnie Nickey. Offensive captains for the season were named weekly, and were: Craig Krenzel (Texas Tech, Penn State, and Michigan), Mike Stafford (Kent State), Ben Hartsock (Washington State and Illinois), Ivan Douglas (Cincinnati), Chris Vance (Indiana), Alex Stepanovich (Northwestern and Purdue), Michael Jenkins (San Jose State), Shane Olivea (Wisconsin), and for the Minnesota game, Andy Groom and Bryce Bishop. (2002 archive October 12, 2002)

Schedule

Coaching staff
 Jim Tressel – Head Coach – 2nd year
 Jim Bollman – Offensive Line / Offensive Coordinator (2nd year)
 Bill Conley – Tight Ends / Recruiting Coordinator (16th year)
 Joe Daniels – Quarterbacks (2nd year)
 Mark Dantonio – Defensive Coordinator (2nd year)
 Luke Fickell – Special Teams (2nd year)
 Jim Heacock – Defensive Line (7th year)
 Mark Snyder – Defensive Linebackers (2nd year)
 Tim Spencer – Running Backs (9th year)
 Mel Tucker – Defensive Backs (2nd year)
 Bob Tucker – Director of Football Operations (8th year)
 Dick Tressel – Associate Director of Football Operations (2nd year)

Personnel

Game summaries

Texas Tech

Source: 
    
    
    
    
    
    
    
    
    
    

The Buckeyes began the 2002 season in Ohio Stadium against the Texas Tech Red Raiders on August 24, 2002, in the final edition of the Pigskin Classic. Like Ohio State, Texas Tech had posted a 7–5 record in 2001, narrowly losing to Iowa in the Alamo Bowl. Tailback Maurice Clarett, the first true freshman to start at tailback in school history, (Athletic Department archive August 24, 2002) scored three touchdowns in his first game, sparking a convincing 45–21 win. Seven sacks of Heisman Trophy candidate Kliff Kingsbury and containment of the Tech offense until late in the game did much to establish the credibility of the Buckeye defense.

Kent State

Source: 
    
    
    
    
    
    
    
    
    
    
    
    

 
Ohio State, now ranked 8th in the AP Poll, built a 38-0 lead before halftime against the Kent State Golden Flashes, with quarterback Craig Krenzel completing his first 11 passes, safety Mike Doss and freshman linebacker A. J. Hawk returning interceptions for touchdowns, and Maurice Clarett scoring twice. Kent State scored twice in the last 4 minutes of the first half but never threatened an upset. With the game in hand, backup quarterback Scott McMullen directed the Buckeye offense for much of the second half, completing 7 of his 11 passes. The Buckeyes took only 47 snaps compared to 80 by the Golden Flashes and actually had a 2:1 deficit in time of possession, but outgained Kent State by 60 yards. Sophomore place kicker Mike Nugent, who had been uneven in his kicking as a freshman, gave an indication of his future value to the team by kicking field goals of 41, 33, and 45 yards.

Washington State

Now ranked sixth in the nation, the Buckeyes faced their first marquee opponent and second Heisman quarterback candidate in Jason Gesser on September 14 when they hosted the 10th-ranked Cougars of Washington State. The game was billed by many in the media as a possible Rose Bowl-preview and was televised nationally (Keels p. 28).

Washington State appeared to live up to its billing with an 11-play 80-yard drive midway through the 1st quarter that was capped by a short touchdown pass from Gesser. In addition the Cougar defense limited tailback Maurice Clarett to just 36 yards rushing and held the Buckeyes to only a pair of field goals in the half. However Ohio State's defense stymied Washington State throughout the game, intercepting Gesser twice and forcing the Cougars to surrender the ball on downs twice in Buckeye territory.

In the second half Clarett picked up 44 yards on his first rush and destroyed the Cougar defense with 194 second-half yards. His 230 yards rushing for the day was the 6th best in Buckeye history and just short of Archie Griffin's freshman record of 239. (Keels p. 28, Lindy's p. 26) He scored twice and Ohio State got a Nugent field goal and a safety to win convincingly. The following Tuesday, in his weekly luncheon with the media, Coach Jim Tressel revealed that Clarett had suffered a knee injury during the game, had already undergone arthroscopic surgery, and would miss the next game.

Cincinnati

The first of many nailbiters for Buckeye fans came September 21 against the 1–1 Cincinnati Bearcats as the team required an interception in the end zone by safety Will Allen with 32 seconds remaining to seal a 23–19 victory. Playing a rare road game against an Ohio opponent in Paul Brown Stadium, named for an illustrious former Buckeye head coach, 6th-ranked Ohio State played much of the game trailing the unranked Bearcats of Conference USA, who had narrowly lost by a field goal the previous week to West Virginia. UC put up more than 400 yards of offense, bombing the Buckeye defense with 52 passes, but was stymied by dropped passes and two 4th quarter interceptions.

Sophomore running back Lydell Ross, starting in place of the injured Clarett, rushed for 130 yards. Wide receiver Chris Gamble had practiced all week as a defensive back and was used on a 3rd down for UC from the Ohio State 29 in the 4th quarter, making an interception in the end zone. Craig Krenzel, who had scrambled for 64 yards on 14 carries in the first three games, scored the winning touchdown with less than 4 minutes to play, twisting and spinning through the Bearcat defenders for 6 yards. (Keels p. 35)

Indiana

6th-ranked and undefeated Ohio State took care of business in opening the Big Ten schedule with a 45-17 win over the 2-2 Indiana Hoosiers. Maurice Clarett returned to play after 2 weeks recuperating from his knee surgery September 16 and scored three times in the first half while accruing 104 yards rushing. After leading only 21–10 at halftime, Ohio State blew open the game with three scores in the 3rd quarter to win decisively, totalling 244 yards of rushing and 461 overall.

Playing both defense and offense, Chris Gamble scored on a 43-yard reverse on the first drive of the 3rd quarter. Indiana had to punt on the ensuing possession and safety Dustin Fox blocked the kick. Ohio State took over at the Indiana 18 and scored on a short pass from Krenzel to Michael Jenkins to take a 35–10 lead.

Northwestern

The next week, on the road against the Northwestern Wildcats, which entered the game with a 2-3 record and 0-1 in conference play, Ohio State played a night game in Evanston, Illinois, in accordance with a scheduling agreement between the Big Ten and ESPN (Keels, p. 41). The game was again unusually close, with Clarett fumbling three times and caught by the TV cameras arguing with running backs coach Tim Spencer on the sidelines (Keels, p. 42), but he also carried the ball for 140 yards and two scores as Ohio State prevailed 27-16.

Northwestern had a 6-0 lead after the 1st quarter but had had two drives stopped inside the Ohio State ten-yard line. They later missed a pair of field goal attempts before scoring a touchdown with less than 2 minutes remaining in the 3rd quarter to narrow the Buckeye lead to 24-16. Ohio State replied with a long drive and a field goal by Mike Nugent, then used an interception by Cie Grant and a fumble recovery by Donnie Nickey to keep Northwestern at bay.

San Jose State

Ohio State for the second season in a row played a non-conference West Coast team at mid-season, hosting the San Jose State Spartans for Homecoming on October 12. San Jose State had attempted to cancel the game because its schedule featured seven road games in an 8-week span, but was unable to find a replacement team for the Buckeye home date. The Spartans, 4-2, had already defeated Illinois, had a three-game winning streak, and entered the game with a defense that led Division I-A in taking the ball away from its opponents. The game started slowly and was tied 7-7 early in the 2nd quarter.

The Buckeye defense, however, held SJS to 265 yards of offense, all of it passing yardage, despite the Spartans completing 81.8% of their 44 passes. (Lindy's, p. 42) The offense ran up 567 yards, a season-high, with Krenzel and backup Scott McMullen combining for 355 yards passing on only 19 completions. Krenzel threw for three touchdowns to break the game open in the 3rd quarter, Clarett rushed for 132 yards and scored three times, and Mike Nugent connected on three field goals, tying the school record for 15 straight without a miss.

Wisconsin

Ohio State faced its next big test on the road October 19, in Madison, Wisconsin, taking on the Wisconsin Badgers in one of the most hostile stadiums in the nation. Ranked fourth now, Ohio State faced a Badger team that had opened its season 5-0, but had lost its first two conference games, and 7 of its last 9 conference games at home, and was playing without its top wide receiver, Lee Evans. Animosity simmered in both teams as each had resented the other dancing on their logos after road wins in the immediately preceding years. (Keels p. 46)

Ohio State scored on its first possession with a long pass from Krenzel to Jenkins, but by halftime Wisconsin led, 14-13, on two long plays in each quarter. The 3rd quarter was scoreless, but midway through the 4th, on a 3rd and 6 from its own 16, Krenzel delivered a high pass 45 yards to Michael Jenkins, who out-jumped two defenders to give the Buckeyes a first down in Wisconsin territory. Krenzel completed the drive with a short touchdown pass to tight end Ben Hartsock, and although a try for a 2-point conversion failed, the Buckeyes led 19-14.

Wide receiver Chris Gamble, who had played defensive back on key downs earlier in the season, was sent into the game when Wisconsin faced a 3-and-11 at the Buckeye 29-yard line. Gamble intercepted the next pass in the end zone to preserve the lead. Also a key player in the victory was punter Andy Groom, whose six punts averaged 50.2 yards, with a 4th quarter punt that went for 74 yards and another that was downed at the Wisconsin 1-yard line. Maurice Clarett rushed for 133 yards but suffered a shoulder stinger on his last carry, an injury that would severely limit his availability over the next four games.

Penn State

The following week, on October 26, the Buckeyes returned to Columbus to face Joe Paterno's Penn State Nittany Lions, ranked 17th in the AP, with a 5–2 overall record and a 1–2 conference record, its losses to Iowa and Michigan. The Ohio State offense struggled throughout the game, exemplified by Craig Krenzel losing a fumble at the Penn State one on Ohio State's first possession, but the defense held Penn State's offense to only seven points and a season-low 179 yards and 8 first downs (tying the Penn State school record for fewest first downs, which surprisingly occurred in Penn State's memorable 14-10 upset of the Miami Hurricanes in the 1987 Fiesta Bowl that grabbed them the national championship). Heisman Trophy finalist Larry Johnson was held to a season-low 66 yards rushing on 16 attempts.

The game featured Chris Gamble starting on both offense and defense (which had last occurred for Ohio State in 1963) and playing 89 of the game's 138 plays (51 on defense, 31 on offense, and 7 on punt returns). (Lindy's p. 50) After Krenzel's fumble, Gamble caught the Penn State defender from behind at the OSU 41, preventing a touchdown return, and two plays later A. J. Hawk ended the threat with his second interception of the year.

The key play of the game, however, came on the first series of the 3rd quarter with Penn State in possession and having the lead, 7–3. Gamble "jumped the route" of the Penn State receiver, intercepted the ball at the Nittany Lion 40, and returned it down the sideline for a touchdown, the only one scored by Ohio State in the game. In all the Buckeyes intercepted three passes, but controversy ensued near the end of the game when Gamble appeared to interfere with a Lion receiver but was not called for a penalty. (Lindy's, p. 50) Clarett played only the first series of the game before injuring his shoulder again and leaving the game.

Buckeye radio broadcaster Paul Keels, in his book recounting the season, noted that the fans in Ohio Stadium that day were unusually loud and supportive. (P. 53)

Minnesota

The team was far more dominant on November 2, posting an impressive 34-3 rout of the 19th-ranked Minnesota Golden Gophers. Minnesota, at 7-1 overall and 3-1 in conference play, was a contender for the Big Ten title. The Gophers blocked a punt that led to the first score of the day, a field goal, but Ohio State's defense throttled the Minnesota rushing attack, which had been averaging 271 yards a game, (Lindy's, p. 54) holding it to 53 yards and the passing attack to 59, and Minnesota, despite starting its next two possessions at its 45, was unable to score further.

Lydell Ross and Maurice Hall, playing in place of the injured Clarett, rushed for 89 and 93 yards respectively, as Ohio State scored 34 unanswered points. Defensive linemen Darrion Scott, Simon Fraser, and David Thompson recorded 4 sacks and were instrumental in stopping the run.

Purdue

On November 9, the 3rd-ranked Buckeyes, in an unexpectedly close game with the 4-5 Purdue Boilermakers (2-3 in Big Ten play), delivered one of the most thrilling moments in Ohio State football history. The offense had been stagnant the entire game, unable to run against the Purdue defense. Maurice Clarett, still hampered by the recurrence of his stinger injury in the Penn State game, carried the ball only 14 times for 52 yards. Krenzel had completed only 11 passes for 123 yards when Ohio State faced a 3rd and 14 from midfield, trailing 6–3 late in the fourth quarter. He scrambled in the passing pocket and completed a pass along the sideline to tight end Ben Hartsock but came up a yard short of a first down at the 37-yard line with just over 2:00 remaining in the game.

On fourth down with a yard to go, coach Jim Tressel opted against attempting a 54-yard field goal by Mike Nugent to tie the game, and in an uncharacteristically high-risk move, ran pass play "King Right 64 Y Shallow Swap" instead, whose first option was a short crossing pass ("shallow swap") to Hartsock (the "Y" receiver). Instead, Krenzel went deep to wide receiver Michael Jenkins, jostling with defensive back Antwaun Rogers. Jenkins caught the pass at the goal line and scored. After a Gamble interception of Purdue quarterback Kyle Orton stifled any comeback by the Boilermakers, the Buckeyes escaped West Lafayette with a victory, 10-6. From his call of the touchdown, ABC announcer Brent Musburger uttered a phrase that has gone down in Buckeye lore: "Holy Buckeye".

The Buckeye defense was equally stellar, limiting Purdue to a pair of field goals on four possessions inside the Ohio State 20, and an interception by middle linebacker Matt Wilhelm allowed Mike Nugent to kick a tying field goal as the clock ran out in the first half.

Illinois

The Buckeyes had risen in the polls to now rank 2nd, and concluded their season road games in Champaign, Illinois, taking on the 4-6 Illinois Fighting Illini. Illinois was 3–3 in conference play, and what seemed to be a mismatch proved to be yet another dangerously close game as the Illini kicked a field goal on the last play of the 4th quarter to come from behind to force overtime.

As it had on its earlier road games, Ohio State struggled offensively with an inconsistent running game minus Maurice Clarett. Illinois took the lead in the 3rd quarter, only to lose it on a 50-yard strike from Krenzel to Jenkins. The teams exchanged field goals before Illinois missed a 59-yard attempt with only 2 minutes left that appeared to settle the game, but the Illini forced a punt and tied the game as time expired in regulation play.

The overtime game was the first ever played by Ohio State, and on the opening possession the Buckeyes scored, with Krenzel scrambling from the pocket for 14 yards and Maurice Hall scoring on an 8-yard run up the middle. The Illini appeared to make two touchdown receptions in their possession but the first was out-of-bounds and the second a bobbled incompletion. Defensive lineman Tim Anderson knocked down the final attempt to keep the Buckeyes undefeated. (Lindy's p. 62: Keels, p. 74-75)

Michigan

The regular season finale against the Michigan Wolverines on November 23 logically became the most important of the regular season. Michigan was 9-2, with a 6-1 Big Ten record, and ranked 9th in the USA Today poll and 12th in the AP. The intensity of the Michigan-Ohio State rivalry was increased by the stakes: a victory by the 12-0 Buckeyes would secure a spot for them in the BCS National Championship game. Michigan had ruined Ohio State attempts at undefeated regular seasons three times in the past decade (1993, 1995, 1996), and hoped to spoil yet another national title bid.

The game was fittingly intense, with the Wolverines ahead or within striking distance of the Buckeyes for the entire game. Maurice Clarett, returning from injury, scored an early touchdown to put the team ahead 7–3, and the defense held Michigan to three first half field goals that included a crucial stop inside the Ohio State ten just before the half. Trailing 9–7 in the fourth quarter, Krenzel engineered a drive from the Michigan 43 with 8:30 remaining. After gaining a first down on a 4th down quarterback sneak, Krenzel completed a pass (and another play name went into Buckeye legend: Gun Switch Right Dart 59 X Skinny Wheel) to Clarett swinging left out of the backfield ("wheel") while the wide receiver ran a post pattern to decoy the secondary ("X skinny") that resulted in a first down at the Michigan six-yard line. Two plays later, with 4:55 to go, Maurice Hall took an option pitch from Krenzel and ran into the endzone from two yards out.

After a lost fumble with two minutes remaining, Michigan regained possession at its own 20 with only 50 seconds. They moved the ball, but the final pass attempt by Michigan quarterback John Navarre, with 0:01 left and long to the endzone, was intercepted by Will Allen.

With the victory, Ohio State finished the 2002 season by sharing the conference crown with the Iowa Hawkeyes, who also went undefeated in Big Ten play.

Fiesta Bowl

Following their defeat of Michigan, Ohio State faced the number one ranked and heavily favored (11.5 points) Miami Hurricanes in the Fiesta Bowl on January 3, 2003, selected that year as the championship game for the teams ranked first and second in the BCS ratings. The Hurricanes were attempting to win their second consecutive championship, winning the Rose Bowl in the previous season and winning 34 straight games in dominating fashion. Led by Heisman Trophy finalists quarterback Ken Dorsey and tailback Willis McGahee, Miami was favored by nearly two touchdowns over the offensively anemic Buckeyes.

The Hurricanes jumped out to an early 7–0 lead, quieting the largely scarlet and gray crowd. The second quarter, however, belonged to Ohio State, with a Mike Doss interception setting up a Craig Krenzel touchdown run which was followed by a Ken Dorsey fumble setting up the Buckeyes on the Miami 14. A Maurice Clarett touchdown run put Ohio State ahead 14–7 at halftime.

The Hurricanes stalled on their opening drive of the half, handing the ball over to Ohio State who drove inside the Miami ten-yard line before Krenzel was intercepted by Sean Taylor, who was then stripped of the ball by Maurice Clarett on the return. The Buckeyes settled for a field goal and a ten-point lead.

A Willis McGahee touchdown run brought the Hurricanes within 3 points by the beginning of the fourth quarter. On third down a catch by Chris Gamble was ruled incomplete due to his being out of bounds. Replays however seem to show that: 1) Gamble had his jersey grabbed on this play which could have resulted in pass interference call and a consequent Ohio State first down. 2) Gamble appeared to land inbounds, again a first down. With a first down Ohio State would have been in a position to run the clock out and win the game without it going to overtime. Instead they had to punt and Groom punted the ball 44 yards. Todd Sievers kicked a field goal to send the game into overtime.

On their first possession in overtime, the Hurricanes scored a touchdown on a 7-yard pass to Kellen Winslow. Ohio State tied the game on their first possession of overtime, with Krenzel plunging 1 yard into the endzone.  On their subsequent possession, Clarett would scamper 5 yards to put Ohio State ahead.  Miami (Fl) had one last possession to tie the game, however Ohio State forced a lame duck throw out of the hands of Dorsey, killing Miami (Fl)'s national title hopes.

Rankings

Depth chart

Source: Athletic Department official site, 2002 football archive 12-10-02 depth chart

Awards and honors
Maurice Clarett, Big Ten Freshman of the Year

Draft picks

References

Additional sources
 
 Lindy Davis (2002), Lindy's Sports Annuals Presents National Champions!, DMD Publications, Birmingham, Alabama.
 Sandra Bailey, et al. (2002), Sports Illustrated Presents Ohio State Buckeyes 2002: A Perfect Season (2002-12-18), Time Inc.

Ohio State
Ohio State Buckeyes football seasons
BCS National Champions
Big Ten Conference football champion seasons
Fiesta Bowl champion seasons
College football undefeated seasons
Ohio State Buckeyes football